The Norwegian Internet Exchange or NIX is an Internet exchange with presence in Tromsø, Trondheim, Bergen, Stavanger and Oslo, Norway. NIX is owned and operated by the Centre for Information Technology Services (USIT), at the University of Oslo. Companies connected to the NIX are most ISPs operating in Norway, in addition to Amazon and the two largest Norwegian broadcasting companies, NRK and TV2. NIX has a neutral pricing model.

NIX1 is the primary site for the Norwegian Internet Exchange. NIX1 is colocated at three sites in Oslo.

NIX2 is the primary site for redundancy located at Kristian Augusts gate 17 in downtown Oslo.

The remaining four sites are regional sites intended for local use.

 BIX in Bergen
 TRDIX in Trondheim
 TIX in Tromsø
 SIX in Stavanger

The term NIX refers to all of the six IXPs.

References

External links 
 
 NKOM comment on 2007 Telenor withdrawal (norwegian)

University of Oslo
Internet in Norway
Internet exchange points in Europe